The MP Lafer was an automobile built in Brazil by Lafer S.A. beginning in 1974. Created by Percival Lafer, a furniture manufacturer, it was a fiberglass-bodied two-seat roadster that took its styling cues from the classic British sports cars of the 1940s and early '50s, with a strong resemblance to the MG T-series and Morgan Plus 4. Unlike those, however, its chassis, engine, manual transmission, steering and suspension were from the Volkswagen Beetle (known as the Fusca in Brazil). Although the stock VW Type 1 four-cylinder made it somewhat underpowered, it became a sought-after car in its time. Approximately 4,300 were built over its 16-year production span. It was available in two models—the classic MP, and the more modern TI, introduced in March 1984. Some 1,000 were exported, most to Europe but some to the United States.

References

Cars introduced in 1974
1980s cars
Cars of Brazil
Retro-style automobiles
Rear-wheel-drive vehicles
Rear-engined vehicles